An Expert in Murder is a historical crime novel by Nicola Upson, published on March 6, 2008.

Plot
The novel is set in the London theatres of the 1930s.  The book revolves around Josephine Tey, a version of the famous novelist.  The story begins with Tey taking the train from Scotland to London in order to attend the final week of performances of her renowned play, Richard of Bordeaux, written under the pseudonym Gordon Daviot.  On board, she meets a young woman, Elspeth Simmons, the adopted daughter of hatmakers from Berwick-upon-Tweed.  The two strike up a friendship on the journey, as the girl is a fan of Tey's work, and is on her way to see the play again.

Upon arriving in London, the pair separate, as Elspeth has left her bag on the train.  Soon after, the girl is found dead, apparently having been stabbed with a hat pin, a crime which seems to have been carefully planned.  Here enters Detective Inspector Archie Penrose, an old acquaintance of Tey's, the best friend of her lover, whom Penrose saw die at the Somme.

Clues and circumstance suggest that Tey may have been the intended target, so the narrative follows her and her time at the theatre.  There, we are introduced to a world of excitement and intrigue, and more death follows. We meet the leads in the play, Johnny and Lydia; the two are presumably based on the real life leads in the best-selling run, John Gielgud, whose career it, arguably, made, and Gwen Ffrangcon-Davies.  The back-stabbing world of casting and performance combines with the classic murder mystery plot.

Critical reception
There has been a mixed reception for the book.  It has been lauded for its frank portrayal of homosexuality, but many say it has failed to cast any light on Tey herself.

Radio Adaptation
The book was dramatised in ten parts by Robin Brooks for BBC Radio 4's Woman's Hour Drama, starring Meg Fraser. It was broadcast between April 21, 2008 and May 2, 2008, barely a month after the novel's publication.

References

2008 British novels
British crime novels
British historical novels
Novels about actors
Novels about writers
Novels set in London
Fiction set in the 1930s
Faber and Faber books